Elections were held in Peterborough County, Ontario, on October 22, 2018, in conjunction with municipal elections across the province.

Peterborough County Council
Peterborough County Council consists of two members from each of the county's constituent municipalities.

Asphodel-Norwood

Source:

Cavan Monaghan

Source:

Douro-Dummer

Havelock-Belmont-Methuen

Source:

North Kawartha

Source:

Otonabee-South Monaghan

Selwyn

Source:

Trent Lakes

Source:

References

Peterborough
Peterborough County